is a lost 1932 Japanese film. It was the first sound film directed by Yasujirō Ozu.

Plot
A romance between a young soldier and a prostitute unfolds over the course of one night.

Production
According to Ozu's recollections, Until the Day We Meet Again was made a year after the release of the first Japanese talkie, Madamu to nubo (The Neighbour's Wife and Mine). The director, who had initially resisted the trend towards talking pictures, agreed to use an experimental sound process developed by Hideo Mohara, rather than the more popular Dobashi sound system. The film apparently contained a musical track and sound effects but no audible dialog scenes.

Cast
Yoshiko Okada - Woman
Joji Oka - Man
Shin'yō Nara - Father
Hiroko Kawasaki - Sister
Chōko Iida - Sister
Satoko Date - Girlfriend
Mitsuko Yoshikawa - Another Girl

References

External links
 

1932 films
Lost Japanese films
1932 drama films
Japanese drama films
Films directed by Yasujirō Ozu
Japanese black-and-white films
1932 lost films
Lost drama films